Chupa is an upcoming fantasy adventure film directed by Jonás Cuarón, and starring Demián Bichir and Christian Slater. Produced by 26th Street Pictures, it is scheduled for release on April 7, 2023, on Netflix.

Synopsis
After discovering a chupacabra living in his grandfather’s shed while visiting in Mexico, a teenage boy and his cousins accompany the creature.

Cast 
 Demián Bichir
 Christian Slater
 Evan Whitten as Alex
 Ashley Ciarra as Luna
 Nickolas Verdugo as Memo

Production
In August 2020, Jonás Cuarón was set to direct a chupacabra film, he co-wrote with Marcus Rinehart, Sean Kennedy Moore and Joe Barnathan. Chris Columbus, Michael Barnathan and Mark Radcliffe produced the film under their 26th Street Pictures banner for Netflix. In June 2021, the film was titled Chupa, with Demián Bichir, Evan Whitten, Ashley Ciarra and Nickolas Verdugo joining the cast.

Filming took place in multiple locations throughout New Mexico starting in August and running through October 2021.

Release 
Netflix revealed that the film was set to release in early 2023. In March 2023, a release date of April 7 was announced. The announcement of the name was met with some criticism due to the word "chupa" being a slang term for fellatio in Spanish.

References

External links 
 
 

2023 films
2020s English-language films
American fantasy films
American fantasy adventure films
English-language Netflix original films
Films based on folklore
Films produced by Chris Columbus
Films set in Mexico
Films shot in New Mexico
Upcoming English-language films
Upcoming Netflix original films
Upcoming films